Jonathan Seda (born October 14, 1970) is an American actor. Seda was an amateur boxer who auditioned for and was given a role in the 1992 boxing film Gladiator. He played the role of Chris Pérez alongside Jennifer Lopez in the movie Selena, and portrayed U.S. Marine John Basilone, recipient of the Medal of Honor, in Tom Hanks and Steven Spielberg's The Pacific. On television, he had roles as Detective Antonio Dawson in NBC's Chicago P.D., and as Paul Falsone in NBC's Homicide: Life on the Street.

Early life
Seda was born in Manhattan to parents of Puerto Rican descent and raised in Clifton, New Jersey. After graduating from Clifton High School, Seda was convinced by two friends that he should take up boxing, so he began working out in a gym.

He boxed in several gyms in New Jersey and soon was a runner up in the New Jersey Golden Gloves competition. As an amateur boxer, Seda had a record of 21 wins and one loss.

Career
Seda's film debut was in the boxing film Gladiator (1992), in which he played the role of Romano, a Cuban boxer. He has since worked in various films and TV series. In 1995, Seda was nominated Best Male Lead at the Spirit Awards for his role in the movie I Like It Like That (1994), opposite Rita Moreno and Lauren Vélez. In 1996, he was nominated for the Palme d'Or (Best Actor Award) at the Cannes Film Festival, for his role as Blue in the film The Sunchaser, opposite actor Woody Harrelson.

Seda became widely known to the Hispanic film audience when he portrayed Chris Pérez alongside Jennifer Lopez in Selena (1997), a film based on the true story of the Tejano singer, Selena Quintanilla-Perez, who was murdered on her way to mainstream stardom. Seda played Selena's husband.

Also in 1997, Seda landed the role of Detective Paul Falsone on NBC's: Homicide: Life on the Street. The writers, taking advantage of his boxing background, wrote a shirtless practice bout into an episode, which established his character's attractiveness to fellow detective Laura Ballard. Seda also boxed opposite Jimmy Smits in the film Price of Glory (2000).

His first leading role on the large screen was as the protagonist in 2002's King Rikki, a re-imagining of Shakespeare's Richard III in East L.A.

Seda has appeared in more than two dozen movies, including Bad Boys II (2003) as Roberto, as well as numerous television appearances. Aside from Homicide, he has had notable roles as Dino Ortolani in Oz, Matty Caffey in  Third Watch, Paul Falsone (in a Homicide crossover with Law & Order), House, and CSI: Miami. He is featured as one of the three leads in the  HBO World War II mini-series The Pacific (released on March 14, 2010), portraying Marine John Basilone. Seda appeared as a guest star in an episode of Burn Notice, and in 2007 he made a cameo appearance in Ludacris' song "Runaway Love", as an abusive, alcoholic stepfather.

Seda appeared in Treme seasons 2-4 as Nelson Hidalgo, a politically connected land developer from Dallas who helps out with the relief efforts in post-Katrina New Orleans. He appeared in the film Larry Crowne (2011), which starred and was co-written and directed by Tom Hanks. Hanks also served as an executive producer on The Pacific, in which Seda starred. In 2013, Seda starred alongside Sylvester Stallone, Christian Slater, and Jason Momoa in the Walter Hill-directed action thriller Bullet to the Head.

In 2012, Seda began portraying Detective Antonio Dawson in Dick Wolf’s Chicago franchise, first starring in Chicago Fire in a recurring role and then, in 2014, as part of the main cast of the spin-off Chicago P.D. In 2017, Seda carried his role over into another spin-off, Chicago Justice, which was canceled after its first season. His daughter Haley made a guest appearance on Chicago P.D. as a key witness in a bombing. In July 2017, it was announced that Seda would return to Chicago P.D. following the cancellation of Chicago Justice. On April 19, 2019, it was reported that NBC/Wolf Entertainment officials informed Seda that they would not be renewing his contract, which led to his leaving the series shortly after six seasons.

In 2020, Seda was cast in the lead role of Dr. Benjamine Glass in the pilot of the NBC apocalyptic drama series La Brea, written by David Appelbaum,. With the COVID-19 pandemic disrupting production of the  pilot, NBC allowed Seda's contract to expire along with most of the other pilot cast members. However, with the pilot being picked up straight-to-series in January 2021, Seda returned to the show, with his character rewritten as Dr. Sam Velez.

Personal life
Seda married his longtime girlfriend, Lisa Gomez, in 2000. The couple have four children.

Filmography

Films

Television

See also
 List of Puerto Ricans

References

External links
 
 
 Jon Seda fan-site

1970 births
American male film actors
American male television actors
American people of Puerto Rican descent
Hispanic and Latino American male actors
Living people
Male actors from New York City
Clifton High School (New Jersey) alumni
People from Clifton, New Jersey